Foreign Heights is an Australian hip hop band made up of Maya Jupiter, MC Trey and Nick Toth. They released their self-titled debut album in January 2007. Their single "Get Yours (Remix)" was nominated for the 2007 ARIA Award for Best Urban Release

Band members
Maya Jupiter
MC Trey
Nick Toth

Discography
Foreign Heights (2007) - Grindin’/Central Station Records
"It Goes On" featuring Mr Zux (2006)
"Get Yours"

References

Australian hip hop groups
Musical groups established in 2006
Australian musical trios